The men's 50 kilometre walk at the 2009 World Championships in Athletics took place on August 21, 2009, on the streets of Berlin, Germany. The event started and finished at the Brandenburg Gate.

Prior to the competition, previous winners did not appear to be medal prospects: the defending world champion Nathan Deakes missed the competition due to injury, and the reigning Olympic champion Alex Schwazer had failed to finish his sole 50 km race of the season. Frenchman Yohann Diniz, as the European Champion, was expected to perform well. The Russian team of world record holder Denis Nizhegorodov, Yuriy Andronov and former world champion Sergey Kirdyapkin appeared to be the strongest. Norwegians Erik Tysse and Trond Nymark were possible medallists as were Jesús Ángel García and Jared Tallent. Zhao Chengliang, Li Lei, and Xu Faguang were suggested as candidates to win the Chinese team's first medal of the championships.

The final began in wet conditions, but Yuki Yamazaki and Luke Adams built up a considerable early lead. Tallent and Diniz caught up with them around the 5 km mark, but a large pack of walkers containing a number of contenders remained not far off the leaders. After the first hour, a six-strong pack of Nizhegorodov and Kirdyapkin, Tallent and Adams, and Yamazaki and Diniz had broken away from the rest. At the halfway point Yamazaki, after receiving a number of warnings, was disqualified and Schwazer decided to prematurely stop his own race. The remaining five stayed in contention until the 40 km mark, where Nizhegorodov pulled out, and Diniz and Adams began to drift away from the leaders. Kirdyapkin sped ahead of Tallent and Trond Nymark had a late burst and caught up with the leaders. Kirdyapkin won, almost three minutes ahead of the rest of the competition, and Nymark took second. García, with a late charge, was not far behind and won the bronze medal.

The 2005 World Champion Kirdyapkin won his second title with a world-leading 3:38:35, the second fastest time of his career after his 2005 winning walk. It marked a racewalk Championship sweep for the Russians, with all three winners being coached by Viktor Chegin. Nymark won the first World Championship medal of career with a new Norwegian record, and veteran García won the fourth medal of his career, although his last came in 2001. A number of athletes set personal bests, including fourth placed Grzegorz Sudoł, but the season's fastest walkers had not performed well with Matej Tóth and Diniz finishing in tenth and twelfth, respectively.

On January 15, 2015, Kirdyapkin's results were disqualified for doping violations.  Most of Chegin's athletes have received similar bans.  Nymark received the gold medal in a ceremony during the 2016 European Athletics Championships.

Medalists

Abbreviations
All times shown are in hours:minutes:seconds

Records

Prior to the competition, the following records were as follows.

No new records was set during this competition.

Qualification standards

Schedule

Results

Key:  DNF = Did not finish, DQ = Disqualified, NR = National record, PB = Personal best, SB = Seasonal best, WL = World leading (in a given season)

References
General
50 km race walk results. IAAF
Specific

Walk 50 kilometres
Racewalking at the World Athletics Championships